SLN  may refer to:
SLN (gene), known as Sarcolipin
 Dutch Sign Language
 Société Le Nickel, a French mining company
 Solid lipid nanoparticle
 Sri Lanka Navy
 Salina Municipal Airport, Kansas, US, IATA code
 SYBYL Line Notation for chemical structures
 Extension for an Asterisk audio file format